A liar is a person who tells lies.

Liar may also refer to:

People with the name
 The Liar, an American video artist and member of Angelspit

Arts, entertainment, and media

Films 
 Liar, a 2002 UK quiz show hosted by Paul Kaye
 The Liar (1961 film), West German film directed by Ladislao Vajda
 The Liar (1981 film), Finnish film directed by Mika Kaurismäki
 Liar (1997 film), UK name for Deceiver
 The Liars (film), 1996 French film

Literature 
 Liar (novel), a 2009 novel by Justine Larbalestier
 "Liar!" (short story), a short story by Isaac Asimov
 The Liar (novel), a 1991 novel by Stephen Fry
 "The Liar" (novella), a 2016 short story by John P. Murphy
 "The Liar" (short story), a short story by Henry James

Music

Albums 
 Liar (Harisu album), 2002
 Liar (The Jesus Lizard album), 1992
 L.I.A.R., a 2016 album by Keri Hilson
 Liar/Dead Is the New Alive, a 2006 EP by Emilie Autumn
 Liars (Liars album), 2007
 Liars (Todd Rundgren album), 2004

Songs 
 "Liar" (Britney Spears song), 2016
 "Liar" (Camila Cabello song), 2019
 "Liar" (Egypt Central song), 2011
 "Liar" (Eskimo Joe song), 2002
 "Liar" (Frans song), 2017
 "Liar" (Madcon song), 2008
 "Liar" (New Order song), 1993
 "Liar" (Profyle song), 2000
 "Liar" (Queen song), 1973
 "Liar" (Rollins Band song), 1994
 "Liar" (Russ Ballard song), a song written by Russ Ballard, recorded by Three Dog Night in 1970
 "Liar" (The Damned song), 1977
 "Liar", by Bikini Kill from Revolution Girl Style Now!
 "Liar", by Built To Spill from You in Reverse
 "Liar", by The Cranberries from Everybody Else Is Doing It, So Why Can't We?
 "Liar", by Emilie Autmn from Opheliac
 "Liar", by Ill Niño from their 2001 album Revolution Revolución
 "Liar", by Korn from See You on the Other Side
 "Liar", by Lȧȧz Rockit from Left for Dead
 "Liar", by Lovebites from Awakening from Abyss
 "Liar", by Megadeth from So Far, So Good... So What!
 "Liar", by the Sex Pistols from Never Mind the Bollocks, Here's the Sex Pistols
 "Liar", by Yngwie J. Malmsteen from Trilogy (Yngwie Malmsteen album)
 "Liar (It Takes One to Know One)", by Taking Back Sunday

Other uses in music
 Liars (band), an American indie rock band

Television
 "The Liar" (Prison Break), 2017 television series episode
 Liar (TV series), 2017 British made miniseries

Theatre 
 The Liar (Corneille play), a 1644 play by Pierre Corneille
 The Liar (Goldoni play), a 1750 play by Carlo Goldoni
 The Liar, a 1950 musical based on Goldoni's play, written and directed by Alfred Drake starring Walter Matthau
 The Liars (play), a play by Henry Arthur Jones

See also 
 
 Lair (disambiguation)
 Layar LRT Station
 Liar Liar (disambiguation)
 Liar paradox, one of the classical paradoxes of logic
 Lier (disambiguation)
 Lyre (disambiguation)
 Republican Party (United States)